Works by artists from San Pedro, California, United States, are found in museums and galleries around the world.

Elmer Albert Batters (1919–1997): fashion and glamour photographer
 Ray Carofano (born 1942): photographer and curator; his work has been exhibited in over 60 galleries and museums, and in photography books and journals in the US and abroad; has lectured and taught workshops at various colleges and universities
 Misty Copeland (born 1982): one of the first African-American female soloists with the American Ballet Theatre; has been described as the muse of popular musician Prince
Eugene L. Daub (born 1942): contemporary figure sculptor; sculptor of the statue of Rosa Parks installed in the US Capitol building in 2013; attended and taught at the Pennsylvania Academy of the Fine Arts in Philadelphia, and taught there; instructor at the Scottsdale Artists' School; designer of the first Philadelphia Liberty Medal, awarded every year to a champion of world peace
 Ron Linden (born 1940): abstract painter, independent curator, and college art instructor; lives and works in San Pedro
 Jay McCafferty (born 1948): creates art through a process of solar burning; has a massive body of work with exhibitions in museums and galleries across the U.S.  
 Jay Meuser (1911–1963): painter who lived in San Pedro from 1944; a bronze plaque in his honor is mounted on a building in the heart of the art gallery district at 343 West Seventh Street
 Mister Cartoon (Mark Machado) (born 1970): Mexican-American artist of designs, sneakers, tattoos, Joker Brand clothing, album covers, video game atmospheres, and public works
 Scott Stantis (born 1959): editorial cartoonist for the Chicago Tribune and USA Today; created the comic strips The Buckets and Prickly City; resided in San Pedro 1977-1986

References

Culture of Los Angeles
Artists from Los Angeles
People from San Pedro, Los Angeles
San Pedro artists